Iris Boudreau-Jeanneau, who publishes under the name Iris, (born 1983) is a Canadian comic book artist living in Quebec.

She was born in the Pointe-Gatineau neighbourhood of Hull (now part of Gatineau) and received a diploma from the École multidisciplinaire de l'image of the Université du Québec en Outaouais in 2006. Iris moved to Montreal the following year, devoting herself to visual arts.

Selected work 
 Dans mes rellignes (2006)
 Justin (2010)
 L'ostie d'chat, in collaboration with Zviane (Sylvie-Anne Ménard) )2013)
 Le pouvoir de l'amour et autres vaines romances, illustrator, text by Yves Pelletier (2014)
 Lac Adélard, illustrator, text by François Blais (2019)

References

External links 
 

1983 births
Living people
21st-century Canadian women artists
Artists from Quebec
Canadian comics artists
Canadian female comics artists
21st-century pseudonymous writers
Pseudonymous women writers
Writers from Gatineau